Bala railway station was on the Great Western Railway's Bala Ffestiniog Line in Wales. It replaced the first Bala station which was further away from the town, on the Ruabon–Barmouth line.

The route to Blaenau was single track throughout. The stations at Bala, Arenig, Trawsfynydd and Festiniog had two platforms, each with its own track. This both allowed for potential traffic and provided passing loops.

Decline
The line northwards to Blaenau Ffestiniog closed to passengers on 2 January 1960 and to freight on 27 January 1961, following a "Last Train" special a week earlier. The short section to Bala Junction closed on 18 January 1965.

The goods shed was an unusual feature. Local landowner Mr. Price of Rhiwlas objected to the construction of the line, and to appease him the goods shed was built to resemble a castle, with mock battlements and turrets.*

There was a small engine shed - a sub-shed of Croes Newydd - to the south east of the station. It opened and closed with the line and was subsequently demolished.

History

The station was opened by the Bala and Festiniog Railway, which was bought by the Great Western Railway in 1910. The station passed to the Western Region of British Railways on nationalisation in 1948. It was closed by the British Transport Commission.

The site today

The station was demolished and a fire station built on the site. The goods yard is now in light industrial use.

References

Sources

Further material

External links
 The station site on a navigable OS Map, via National Library of Scotland
 The station on a navigable 1953 OS map, via npe Maps
 The station and line, via Rail Map Online
 The line LJT2 with mileages, via Railway Codes
 Remisinscences by a local railwayman, via Forgotten Relics
 Images of the station, via Yahoo
 Festiniog and Blaenau Railway, via Festipedia
 Driver's view north of Bala to Blaenau, via YouTube
 Train leaving the station, via alamy
 Several photos of the line, via Penmorfa
 Several photos of the line, via Penmorfa
 The line in 2009, via The Railway Muddler
 The station, via RailScot
 A special through the station site, via 2D53
 1960 Working timetable, via 2D53
 Details of Summer 1989 excursions through the station, via Six Bells Junction
 Deatails and photos of 22 Jan 1961 railtour, via Six Bells Junction
 The 1961 last train special, via YouTube
 An inspection saloon ride on the line, Part 1, via YouTube
 An inspection saloon ride on the line, Part 2, via YouTube
 Mothballed tracks at the station site in 2015, via RailScot
 Signal box diagram, via Signalling Record Society

Disused railway stations in Gwynedd
Railway stations in Great Britain opened in 1882
Railway stations in Great Britain closed in 1965
Former Great Western Railway stations
Beeching closures in Wales
Bala, Gwynedd
1882 establishments in Wales
1965 disestablishments in Wales